is a Japanese screenwriter.

Selected works

Television
 series head writer denoted in bold
Ultraman: Towards the Future (1992)
 Kenkaya Ukon (1993)
 Meibugyo Toyama no Kin-san (1993)
 Ultraman Cosmos (2002)
 Kinyu Fushoku Retto Saisei (2005)
 Neuro: Supernatural Detective (2007) 
 Top Secret ~The Revelation~ (2008) 
 Aoi Bungaku (2009) 
 Jidankoshonin Gota Keshi (2011)
 Himitsu Chouhouin Erika (2011)
Chihayafuru (2011-2012)
 Akagawa Jiro Gensaku Doku Poison (2012)
 Tokusou (2014)
 Shi no Zouki (2015)
 Hitoya no Toge ~Goku no Toge~ (2017)
Ultraman Z (2020)

Films
Spellbound (1999) — Nominated: Japan Academy Prize for best screenplay
Lorelei: The Witch of the Pacific Ocean (2005)
 Moyuru Toki: The Excellent Company (2006)
 Berna no Shippo (2006)
 Dare mo Mamotte Kurenai (2009)
The Incite Mill (2010)

References

External links
Official site 

Japanese screenwriters
Living people
Year of birth missing (living people)